Momordol or 1-hydroxy-1,2-dimethyl-2-[8′,10′-dihydroxy-4′,7′-dimethyl-11′-hydroxy methyl-trideca]-3-ethyl-cyclohex-5-en-4-one is a chemical compound with formula , found in the fresh fruit of the bitter melon (Momordica charantia).

The compound is an oily liquid, soluble in ethyl acetate and methanol but not in pure chloroform or petrol. It was isolated in 1997 by S. Begum and others.

See also 
 Momordicin I
 Momordicin-28
 Momordicinin
 Momordicilin
 Momordenol

References 

Polyols
Enones
Cyclohexenes